''Helichrysum'' sp. nov. D is a species of flowering plant in the family Asteraceae. It is found only in Yemen. Its natural habitat is rocky areas.

References

Sp Nov D
Endangered plants
Undescribed plant species
Taxonomy articles created by Polbot